The 1984 Pretty Polly Classic  was a women's tennis tournament played on indoor carpet court at the Brighton Centre in Brighton, England that was part of the Category 3 tier of the 1984 Virginia Slims World Championship Series. It was the seventh edition of the tournament and was held from 22 October until 28 October 1984. Seventh-seeded Sylvia Hanika won the singles title and earned $32,000 first-prize money.

Finals

Singles
 Sylvia Hanika defeated  Joanne Russell 6–3, 1–6, 6–2
 It was Hanika's 1st singles title of the year and the 5th of her career.

Doubles
 Alycia Moulton /  Paula Smith defeated  Barbara Potter /  Sharon Walsh 6–7, 6–3, 7–5
 It was Moulton's 1st title of the year and the 5th of her career. It was Smith's 3rd title of the year and the 11th of her career.

Notes

References

External links
 International Tennis Federation (ITF) tournament event details
 Tournament draws

Pretty Polly Classic
Brighton International
Pretty Polly Classic
Pretty Polly Classic